O Corgo, is a municipality in the Spanish province of Lugo.

Notable people
Heli Rolando de Tella (1888–1962), military officer.

Municipalities in the Province of Lugo